Bekra Union is a union of Nagarpur Upazila, Tangail District, Bangladesh. It is situated 3 km west of Nagarpur and 27 km south of Tangail city.

Demographics

According to Population Census 2011 performed by Bangladesh Bureau of Statistics, The total population of Bekra union is 10,811. There are 2,487 households in total.

Education

The literacy rate of Bekra Union is 45.8% (Male-48.3%, Female-43.7%).

See also
 Union Councils of Tangail District

References

Populated places in Dhaka Division
Populated places in Tangail District
Unions of Nagarpur Upazila